The Second Battle of the Piave River, fought between 15 and 23 June 1918, was a decisive victory for the Italian Army against the Austro-Hungarian Empire during World War I. Though the battle proved to be a decisive blow to the Austro-Hungarian Empire and by extension the Central Powers, its full significance was not initially appreciated in Italy. Yet Erich Ludendorff, on hearing the news, is reported to have said he 'had the sensation of defeat for the first time'. It would later become clear that the battle was in fact the beginning of the end of the Austro-Hungarian Empire.

Background
With the exit of Russia from the war in 1917, Austria-Hungary was now able to devote significant forces to the Italian Front and to receive reinforcements from their German allies. The Austro-Hungarian emperor Karl reached an agreement with the Germans to undertake a new offensive against Italy, a move supported by both the chief of the general staff Arthur Arz von Straußenburg and the commander of the South Tyrolean Army Group Conrad von Hötzendorf. In the autumn of 1917, the Germans and Austro-Hungarians defeated the Italians at the Battle of Caporetto. After Caporetto, the Italians fell back to the Piave and were reinforced by six French infantry divisions and five British infantry divisions as well as sizeable air contingents.

Prelude
Italy's defeat at Caporetto led to General Luigi Cadorna's dismissal and General Armando Diaz's replacement of him as Chief of Staff of the Italian Army. Diaz set up a strong defense line along the Piave. Up until this point in the war, the Italian army had been fighting alone against the Central Powers; with the defeat at Caporetto, France and Britain sent reinforcements on the Italian front. These, besides accounting for less than a tenth of the Italian forces in theater, had however to be redirected for the major part to the Western Front as soon as the German spring offensive began in March 1918.

The Austro-Hungarian Army had also recently undergone a change in command, and the new Austro-Hungarian Chief of Staff, Arthur Arz von Straußenburg, wished to finish off the Italians. After Caporetto, the Austro-Hungarian offensive put many Italian cities, including Venice and Verona, under the threat of the Central Powers. Austria-Hungary's army had since then longed to achieve these strategic prizes and force Italy into an armistice. Straußenburg's army group commanders, Conrad von Hötzendorf (the former Austro-Hungarian Chief of Staff) and Svetozar Boroević von Bojna, both wished to make a decisive assault against the Italians, but could not agree about the location of the attack. Conrad wanted an attack from the South Tyrolean Alps towards the Asiago Plateau and Vicenza. Boroević first favored a defensive action, but then when pressed preferred a frontal attack along the Piave River. Straußenburg himself was in favour of an attack on the western part of the front (the "Giudicarie" sector) leading to Brescia. Conrad and Boroević had a dislike for each other, and Straußenburg and the emperor, unable to decide between these two strong personalities, divided the army equally between them, reserving only a small part of the forces for a diversionary action on the Giudicarie sector. The preparation of the offensive began in February 1918, after a meeting in Bolzano between the Austro-Hungarian and German high commands. It was strongly recommended by the Germans, as Ludendorff hoped that it could force the increasing American forces in France to be diverted to the Italian front, so Straußenburg modeled the attack after Erich Ludendorff's offensive on the Western Front.

The Austro-Hungarians, differently from their previous success at Caporetto and from the subsequent attempts to break through on Monte Grappa, did not prepare the attack as a pinpoint one, but as an all-out frontal attack, employing the entire residual strength of their army all along the front. The Austro-Hungarian formations were trained to employ the tactics developed by the Germans on the Western Front for Operation Michael, as Austro-Hungarian officers returning from the Eastern Front were extensively trained alongside their German counterparts. There were also innovations on the Italian side. Analyzing the defeat of Caporetto, the staff of Armando Diaz concluded that the main tactical causes of it were the lack of mobility of Italian units, caught in a too rigid defensive scheme, the too centralized command and control system, and the lack of depth of Italian defences, where too many soldiers were simply stuck on the frontline. The new schemes prepared for the battle led to the abolition of the continuous entrenchment and in the development of a highly mobile defence system, in which even the smaller units were allowed to freely move between previously recognized strongpoints, independently decide to retreat or counterattack, or directly call the support of the artillery. Moreover, 13 divisions, equipped with 6000 trucks, were organized in a central reserve, ready to be sent where it was needed.

Battle

General Diaz learned the exact timing of the Austro-Hungarian attack: 3:00 a.m. on 15 June, so at 2:30 a.m., the Italian artillery opened fire all along their front on the crowded enemy trenches, inflicting heavy casualties. In some sectors the artillery barrage had the effect of delaying or stopping the attack, as Austro-Hungarian soldiers began to retreat to their defensive positions, believing they had to face an unexpected Italian attack, but on the greater part of the front the Austro-Hungarians still attacked as planned. Boroević launched the first assault, moving south along the Adriatic coast and in the middle course of the Piave River. On the subsequent days Boroević renewed the assault, but the artillery barrage destroyed many of the river's bridges; the Austro-Hungarian formations that had crossed the river were unable to receive reinforcement and supplies. To make matters worse, the swollen Piave isolated a great number of units on the west bank of the river, which made them an easy target for the Italian fire. It was reported that a large number of Austro-Hungarian soldiers drowned while trying to reach the east bank. On 19 June, Diaz counterattacked and hit Boroević in the flank, inflicting heavy casualties.

In the meantime Conrad attacked along the Italian lines west of Boroević on the Asiago Plateau (on 15 June), with the objective of capturing Vicenza. His forces gained some ground, but came upon stiff resistance from Italian units; 40,000 casualties were added to the Austro-Hungarian total. In the aftermath, Boroević was particularly critical of the behavior of Conrad who, after the complete failure of the first attack, preferred to continue the assaults in the subsequent days but with diminished strength, rather than send reinforcements to the Piave sector.

Lacking supplies and facing attacks by armored units, the Austro-Hungarians were ordered to retreat by Emperor Karl, who had taken personal command, on 20 June. By 23 June, the Italians recaptured all lost territory on the southern bank of the Piave and the battle was over.

Aftermath

After the Austro-Hungarian retreat Diaz was pressed by the allies, particularly by General Ferdinand Foch, to press on and try an assault to break the Austro-Hungarian defences and gain a decisive victory over the Empire. However, the Italian General recognized that the same tactic, that proved so effective on defence, prevented an immediate offence, as the Italian formations at that time were too scattered and mixed up to be effectively coordinated in a decisive assault. Moreover, once the Italian Army crossed the river, they would have to face the same logistic problems as the Austrians. For these reasons, in the subsequent days, only limited actions were fought to gain better start positions for the decisive assault.

On the other side, the Battle of the Piave River was the last great military offensive of Austria-Hungary. A clear failure, the operation struck a major blow to the army's morale and cohesion and had political repercussions throughout war-weary Austria-Hungary. The battle signaled the beginning of the end of the imperial-royal army as an effective fighting force and the foretold the internal political collapse of the multi-ethnic Austro-Hungarian Empire, which was finished off at the Battle of Vittorio Veneto four months later. The army offered stiff resistance for four days from 24 to 28 October during the Allied offensive but collapsed as word reached the troops of the Empire's disintegration at which point there was little point to continue resisting.

The battle also dealt a severe blow to the German Empire strategy, who considered a separate peace with Italy (and exploiting Italian resources in the affluent Po Valley) as a viable way to concentrate efforts in the western front to finally overcome the Allied forces. Erich Ludendorff wrote:This unsuccessful attack was extremely painful. I could no longer hope that relief on the Western Front might be secured in Italy itself.

Order of battle

Italy (Armando Diaz) (west to east)
 7th Italian Army (Giulio Cesare Tassoni)
 1st Italian Army (Guglielmo Pecori Giraldi)
 6th Italian Army (Luca Montuori)
 4th Italian Army (Gaetano Giardino)
 8th Italian Army (Enrico Caviglia)
 3rd Italian Army (Duke of Aosta)
 9th Italian Army (Paolo Morrone) : in reserve.

Austria-Hungary (Arthur Arz von Straußenburg) (west to east)
 Army Group Conrad (or Armygroup Tirol) (Franz Conrad von Hötzendorf)
 10th Army (Alexander von Krobatin)
 11th Army (Viktor Graf von Scheuchenstuel)
 Army Group Boroević (Svetozar Boroević)
 6th Army (Archduke Joseph of Austria)
 5th Army (or Isonzo Army) (Wenzel Freiherr von Wurm)

In popular culture
 Today, to the Italian public two mottos recall the battle: those written as graffiti upon broken walls of destroyed rural houses: "E' meglio vivere un giorno da leone che cent'anni da pecora" ("[It] is better to live one single day as a lion than a hundred years as a sheep") and "Tutti eroi! O il Piave o tutti accoppati" ("Everyone a hero! Either (we hold) the Piave, or let all of us get killed"). The two pieces of wall are preserved in the military shrine of Fagarè della Battaglia, a frazione of San Biagio di Callalta.
 The Battle is also known as the "Battle of the Solstice" so-called by the poet Gabriele D'Annunzio, shortly thereafter. On 9 August 1918, D'Annunzio conducted his Flight over Vienna with 11 Ansaldo airplanes throwing thousands of leaflets from the sky, praising the Italian victory.
 In the shelling and firefights that occurred in July and August after the battle, an 18-year-old American ambulance driver named Ernest Hemingway was wounded there on July 8. Hemingway was knocked unconscious during an Austrian mortar attack. Fragments of the shell entered his lower extremities. Two Italian soldiers standing with Hemingway were killed. In the 1932 film adaptation of Hemingway’s novel A Farewell to Arms, Frederic Henry (Gary Cooper) is wounded in the leg at this Battle.
 The battle is described in Andrew Krivak's novel, "The Sojourn".
 The battle is mentioned in the André Aciman's novel and film Call Me by Your Name. The scene in the film takes place overlooking a memorial to the victims of the battle. The memorial is located in the city of Pandino. In the film however, it is said that 170,000 people died in that battle of Piave.
Pope Francis mentioned in June 2022, in an interview with Jesuit European cultural journal editors, that one of his two grandfathers participated in "an experience on the Piave River", during World War I, presumably referring to either the first or second Piave River Battle.
 The map "Piave" will be featured on FPS-tactical shooter Isonzo (video game), coming February 28th.

See also
 "La Leggenda del Piave", a patriotic song written by E. A. Mario after the battle.
 Pietro Micheletti, Italian military commander fighting in the battle
 Attilio Deffenu, Italian journalist and soldier who died in the battle

Citations

References 
 
 Tucker, Spencer The Great War: 1914–18 (1998)
 The Battle of the Piave River, 1918
 Cronologia: il "Secolo Breve" dal 1914 al 2000 

Conflicts in 1918
Battles of the Italian Front
Battles of World War I involving Austria-Hungary
Battles of World War I involving Italy
Military history of Italy during World War I
1918 in Italy
June 1918 events